Jakob Eisenscher (1896–1980) was born in the Austro-Hungarian Empire. He was an Israeli artist.

Biography 
Jakob Eisenscher was born in Czernowitz, Bukovina in 1896 to Israel Eisenscher and Augustina (née Karber). As a young man, Eisenscher attended the Academy of Fine Arts Vienna. In his youth, Eisenscher was associated with a group of Jewish intellectuals that included Itsik Manger, Eliezer Steinbarg, Bernard Reder and others.

In 1914, he was drafted and sent to the Russian front in Galicia.  In 1915, while stationed in the Alps, he was taken prisoner by the Italian army. He remained in a prisoner-of-war camp throughout World War I and spent much of his time painting. After the war, Eisenscher returned to Czernowitz and worked as a photographer.

Eisenscher immigrated to France in the early 1930s. He worked in Paris for five years, during which he was exposed to Cubism and became heavily influenced by the work of Pablo Picasso and Georges Braque.

In 1935, Eisenscher immigrated to Israel. He studied at the Bezalel Academy of Arts and Design later teaching there, between 1952–67. There, Eisenscher worked with many Israeli artists, many of whom later became well known, prominent figures in Israeli art. Eisenscher exhibited his work all over the world.

In the beginning of his career, Eisenscher produced drawings, woodcuts and figurative paintings. Influenced by German Expressionism, Eisenscher eventually began creating portraits and figurative paintings. By the 1950s, he was interested in painting Cubist-style landscapes which became a major focus for him. His paintings also included visions of the Jewish "shtetls" in Eastern Europe, markets, synagogues and scenes of Israel and its people. His series "Gate" (1969) received much attention as well as the painting "The Night of the 29th of November" which is part of the Knesset collection.

Jakob Eisenscher died in 1980.

A collection of the artist's portrait photographs and letters from the Eisenscher estate is found today at the Information Center for Israeli Art in the Israel Museum, Jerusalem.

Awards and recognition 
 1947 Dizengoff Prize for Painting and Sculpture, Municipality of Tel Aviv-Yafo
 1953 Participated in São Paulo Art Biennial
 1957 Participated in Venice Biennale
 1958 Haifa Fund Prize, Haifa Municipality

Education 
 Academy of Fine Arts Vienna 
 Bezalel Academy of Arts and Design, Jerusalem

Teaching 
 1952–67 Bezalel Academy of Arts and Design, Jerusalem

Exhibitions 
 1927 Municipal Museum, Czernowitz
 1929 Hasefer Gallery, Bucharest
 1935 "Le Balcon" Gallery, Paris, France
 1944 Katz Gallery, Tel Aviv
 1950 Jerusalem Artists House
 1954 Tel Aviv Museum of Art
 1955 Mikra Studio Gallery, Tel Aviv
 1957 National Museum, Bezalel, Jerusalem, Israel
 1960 Bet Zevi, Ramat Gan, Israel
 1964 Tel Aviv Museum, Dizengoff House
 1965 Yad Lebanim, Rechovoth, Israel
 1970 Artist's House, Tel Aviv
 1974 Rosenfeld Gallery, Tel Aviv
 1979 Rosenfeld Gallery, Tel Aviv

See also 
 Visual arts in Israel

References

External links 
 
 

1896 births
1980 deaths
Israeli painters
Romanian emigrants to France
French emigrants to Israel